The oasis town of Qiemo or Cherchen (Uighur: Qarqan, also spelled Charchan) is the capital of Qiemo County, Bayingolin Mongol Autonomous Prefecture, Xinjiang, China. It is on the Qiemo River and at the foot of the Qilian Mountains, on the Southern Silk Route. In ancient times, the town and the kingdom it controlled were jointly  known as Shanshan.

History

Settlement in the Qiemo area dates back to the Bronze Age.  The town is located along the ancient Jade Road that traded with the earliest Chinese dynasties, and Bronze Age rock carvings were found south of town along another ancient trade route to what is now Tibet. Mummies dated to 1,000 BCE were discovered at the Zaghunluq site less than six km southwest of the city center.  A particularly well-preserved one is known as the Cherchen Man.

Qiemo existed as an independent kingdom during the Former Han Dynasty (123 BCE to 23 CE).  It was described in the Hanshu, chapter 96A thus:
 Although the town is described in documents from the 1st century BCE to the 9th century CE, the ancient site has not yet been discovered, even though four major expeditions have searched for it.

The area was ruled as the kingdom of Calmadana during the earliest heyday of the Silk Road. Its fortunes have since ebbed and flowed, mainly with the popularity of the southern trade route. The Chinese Buddhist monk Faxian left a brief account of the country after his visit c. 399 CE, recording that there were probably more than 4,000 monks in the country, all Hinayana. Song Yun passed through around 519, and wrote that the country had just been defeated by the Tuyuhun. It was sometimes abandoned, as when Buddhist monk Xuanzang passed through in the year 644, and when Marco Polo came by in 1273.

In 2018, Jiayuan was newly listed as a residential community.

Geography
Qiemo was strategically located at the junction of the main route from Dunhuang to Khotan via Jingjue and the mountain route to Xining via Qinghai Lake. Qiemo is 315 km east of Minfeng, 605 km east of Hotan, and 351 km west of Charklik/Ruoqiang Town along Highway 315.

Administrative divisions

The town is made up of six residential communities and one village:

Residential Communities (Mandarin Chinese Hanyu Pinyin-derived names):
 Quegelimaya, Gulukawuruke (formerly Gulekeruike), Jiahabage, Ketaimai (formerly Ketaiman), Dianshi Xincun (Dianshixincun), Jiayuan

Village:
 Caidui

Transportation
 Qiemo is well-serviced with buses from the modern bus station just south of the city center, with routes west to Hotan, east to Ruoqiang and north to Korla.
Qiemo Airport is located 13 km northeast of the city center. China Southern Airlines operates flights, usually twice per week, to and from Urumqi via Korla.

References

Further reading
Bonavia, Judy. (2004). The Silk Road: Xi'an to Kashgar. Revised by Christoph Baumer. Odyssey Publications.. .
Hill, John E. (2009) Through the Jade Gate to Rome: A Study of the Silk Routes during the Later Han Dynasty, 1st to 2nd Centuries CE. BookSurge, Charleston, South Carolina. .
Hulsewé, A. F. P. (1979). China in Central Asia: The Early Stage 125 BC – AD 23: an annotated translation of chapters 61 and 96 of the History of the Former Han Dynasty. E. J. Brill, Leiden.

External links
 Tourism Guide to Cherchen / Qiemo A Tourism Guide to Cherchen / Qiemo, Xinjiang, China. Centralasiatraveler.com. Retrieved on 2011-03-12.

Populated places along the Silk Road
Populated places in Xinjiang
Township-level divisions of Xinjiang
Qiemo County